Benson High School may refer to:

Benson High School (Arizona), in Benson, Arizona
Benson High School (Minnesota), in Benson, Minnesota
Benson Polytechnic High School, in Portland, Oregon
Omaha Benson High School, in Omaha, Nebraska